The Gorno-Altai Autonomous Oblast was formed as the Oyrot Autonomous Oblast in 1922 and renamed in 1948.

It was upgraded into an ASSR in 1990, shortly before the dissolution of the Soviet Union. It corresponds to the current Altai Republic.

A minor planet 2232 Altaj discovered in 1969 by Soviet astronomer B. A. Burnasheva is named after Altai.

See also
First Secretary of the Gorno–Altai Communist Party

References

External links
Karakorum republic during Russian civil war?

1922 establishments in Russia
1991 disestablishments in the Soviet Union
Autonomous oblasts of the Soviet Union
States and territories established in 1922
States and territories disestablished in 1991
Politics of the Altai Republic